Vera Doria (born Veronica Eyton) was an Australian actress and opera singer active in Hollywood during the silent era.

Biography 
Vera was born in Tasmania, Australia, to New Zealanders Robert Eyton and Maude Fosbery. She began singing opera in her native Australia as a young woman and toured Europe in the early 1910s.

Eventually followed her older siblings, Alice Eyton (a screenwriter) and Charles Eyton (a film producer) to Los Angeles in 1915 seeking a career as an actress. At the time, she was married to fellow opera singer Juan de la Cruz.

She appears to have retired from acting in the late 1910s to focus on her singing career. She eventually moved to Shanghai, where she met and married her second and third husbands, John Snodgrass and Harold Wavell. after she returned, she became a children's author.

She died on 22 June 1957.

Selected filmography 

 The Veiled Adventure (1919)
 Life's a Funny Proposition (1919)
 A Lady's Name (1918)
 Women's Weapons (1918)
 Mrs. Leffingwell's Boots (1918)
 Salome (1918)
 Sauce for the Goose (1918)
 A Pair of Silk Stockings (1918)
 The Madcap (1916)
 The Majesty of the Law (1915)

References 

Australian film actresses
20th-century Australian actresses
1882 births
1957 deaths
Australian emigrants to the United States